Strodtmann is a German surname. Notable people with the surname include:

Johann Christoph Strodtmann (1717–1756), author
Johann Sigismund Strodtmann (1797–1888), philologist and theologist
Adolf Strodtmann (1829–1879), poet and literary historian

German-language surnames